Saul N. Ramirez Jr. (born October 22, 1958) is an American politician, businessman, and former official in the United States Department of Housing and Urban Development.

Early life and education
Ramirez was born in Los Angeles, California to Saul Ramirez, Sr., and the former Bertha Villarreal. He moved to Laredo when he was three years of age. His father had been a line foreman and diesel engine mechanic at Douglas Aircraft. Ramirez was raised in Laredo, Texas, where he attended the Roman Catholic St. Augustine elementary and high schools.

Career

Mayor of Laredo 
In 1990, Ramirez became the youngest mayor of Laredo, Texas. He earlier served for two four-year terms on the Laredo City Council, prior to becoming mayor. Previously, he worked for nearly two decades in the insurance industry in Laredo. He is a former board member of the Inter-Government Risk Pool of the Texas Municipal League.

Ramirez won the nonpartisan runoff election for mayor in 1990; he defeated Maria Guadalupe "Bebe" Zuñiga (1933–2017) Zuñiga had first faced a court-ordered recount with a third candidate, Rick Reyes, to determine that she had won the right to challenge Ramirez by a margin of only nine votes. The incumbent, Aldo Tatangelo, was term-limited under the Laredo municipal charter and instead ran unsuccessfully later that year for county judge of Webb County. As mayor, Ramirez secured a permit for the construction of the World Trade Bridge. He also worked to build four recreation centers, three fire stations, and a new public library at the intersection of McPherson and Calton roads. Because Ramirez vacated the mayoral position at the end of his second term, a special election was called early in 1998 under the charter. Betty Flores, a former Laredo banker, won that contest and a few months later the regular city election as well.

Clinton administration 
Ramirez resigned with several months remaining in his second term to take a position in the Clinton administration under United States Secretary of Housing and Urban Development, Andrew Cuomo. From 1997 to 1998, Ramirez was the assistant secretary for the Office of Community Planning and Development. On June 19, 1998, Clinton nominated him to become the United States Deputy Secretary of Housing and Urban Development, serving until the end of the administration in January 2001.

On January 1, 1997, the Laredo Morning Times named Ramriez "Laredoan of the Year". In 1995, he was named "Mayor of the Year" by the Texas Municipal Library Directors Association. In 1996, Newsweek magazine named him one of the twenty-five most dynamic mayors in the nation.

In 2008, the Congressional Hispanic Caucus and U.S. Representative Henry R. Cuellar of Laredo petitioned U.S. President-elect Barack Obama to choose Ramirez as HUD secretary. At the time, Ramirez served on Obama's transition team. Obama, however, selected Shaun Donovan for the role.

Later career 
On March 17, 2010, Ramirez testified before the House Financial Services Committee on the Obama administration's "Choice Neighborhoods Initiative," also known as the "Proposal to Revitalize Severely Distressed Public and Assisted Housing."

Since that time, Ramirez has assisted various administrations in addressing and crafting national policy and program activities that relate to economic development and housing efforts.

Ramirez has over twenty years of experience as a risk management and insurance industry executive. He is currently a member of AFL–CIO Housing Investment Trust Building America Advisory Board and the Capital One Community Renewal Fund Advisory Board.

Personal life 
Ramirez and his wife, the former Aggie Ramos, have three children: Saul, Joaquin, and Alexis. They reside outside Washington, D.C. in Vienna, Virginia.

References

Living people
Mayors of Laredo, Texas
United States Deputy Secretaries of Housing and Urban Development
Politicians from Los Angeles
Texas Democrats
Virginia Democrats
Businesspeople from Texas
People from Washington, D.C.
People from Vienna, Virginia
Activists for Hispanic and Latino American civil rights
Activists from California
Hispanic and Latino American politicians
1958 births